Tae Keller is an American children's book author. Her book, When You Trap a Tiger, won the 2021 Newbery Medal. The book tells the story of Lily and her relationship with her aging and ill Korean grandmother, wrapped around the Korean folktales her grandmother tells her at bedtime.

Life 
Tae Keller was born in Honolulu, Hawaii. Her mother is award-winning author Nora Okja Keller. She graduated from Punahou School in 2011 and from Bryn Mawr College in 2015.

Publications 

 The Science of Breakable Things (2018) 
 When You Trap a Tiger (2020)
 Jennifer Chan is Not Alone (2022)
 Mihi Ever After (2022)

When You Trap a Tiger was the 100th book to win the Newbery Medal in 2021, was a 2020 Boston Globe–Horn Book Award honor and won the 2021 Asian/Pacific American Award for Children’s Literature.

References

Year of birth missing (living people)
Newbery Medal winners
American children's writers
Living people
Bryn Mawr College alumni